The Mowry Shale is an Early Cretaceous geologic formation. The formation was named for Mowrie Creek, northwest of Buffalo in Johnson County, Wyoming.

Description

The Mowry Shale or Fish-scale Beds because of the abundance of fish scales, is a dark-gray, siliceous shale that weathers silver gray; it is 10-70 m thick. 40Ar/39Ar of sanidine from a bentonite yielded an age of 97.17 +/-0.69 Ma, thus is Cenomanian in age. Fossils indicate the Mowry was deposited during the early stages of the Western Interior Seaway.

Age 
In so much as the Mowry was observed to lie above formations that were originally thought to be associated with the difficult to date upper Dakota units, especially Newcastle Sandstone, the Mowry was previously thought to be of Cenomanian age. However, recent studies, particularly of fossil pollens and spores, have dated the Mowry to the late-Albian. In many locations, the Mowry is bounded above by the Clay Spur bentonite, which is assigned the radiometric date of 97 million years, the upper Mowry may extend into the earliest Cenomanian.

Paleontology
Invertebrate fossils known include the ammonites Metengonoceras aspenanum, Metengonoceras teigenense, Neogastroplites americanus, and Neogastroplites muelleri.

Isolated, lenticular accumulations of fish bones, scales, teeth and coprolites are thought to represent storm lag deposits formed by winnowing of the seafloor and concentration of the bones in bottom scours.  The following fish species have been identified from the Mowry: an unnamed caturid, an unnamed ichthyodectid, Clupavus sp., Enchodus sp., Apateodus sp., an unnamed alepisaurid, and Xenyllion zonensis. Xenyllion is the oldest acanthomorph (spiny-rayed) teleost in North America. 

Dinosaur remains diagnostic to the genus have been recovered from the formation.

Distribution
The Mowry outcrops or occurs at depth in parts of Colorado, Montana, North Dakota, South Dakota, Utah and Wyoming. It occurs within the following geologic regions: 
Big Horn Basin
Central Montana Uplift
Chadron Arch
Denver Basin
Green River Basin
Montana Fold Belt
North Park Basin
Powder River Basin
Sweetgrass Arch
Uinta Uplift
Williston Basin
Wind River Basin
Yellowstone Province

See also

 List of dinosaur-bearing rock formations
 List of stratigraphic units with few dinosaur genera

References

 Weishampel, David B.; Dodson, Peter; and Osmólska, Halszka (eds.): The Dinosauria, 2nd, Berkeley: University of California Press. 861 pp. .

Shale formations of the United States
Cretaceous Montana
Cretaceous geology of Wyoming